"Ancora qui" is a song recorded by Italian singer Elisa, released on 4 January 2013.

The song was created for the soundtrack of the Quentin Tarantino's film Django Unchained. The music was composed by Ennio Morricone and subsequently Elisa wrote down the lyrics and recorded her performance. Another version of the song was later included in Elisa's album L'anima vola.

Description  
Morricone suggested Elisa to be inspired by her memories and so she wrote the lyrics thinking about one of her childhood friends that died of leukemia.
The song has been a part of the seventy-five pieces among which were chosen the five candidates for the 2013 Oscar for Best Song.

Charts

References 

2013 singles
Elisa (Italian singer) songs
2013 songs